Puranpur is a town and a municipal board in Pilibhit district in the Indian state of Uttar Pradesh. Puranpur  is divided into 25 wards for which elections are held every 5 years. After independence and Partition of India the large numbers of Sikhs migrated and  settled in  the Puranpur Region. Due to dense Sikh population and their lifestyle, The area is also known as Mini Punjab as after Partition of India in 1947.

Demographics 
As of the 2001 Census of India, Puranpur had a population of 37,233. Males constitute 52% of the population and females 48%. Puranpur has an average literacy rate of 54%, lower than the national average rate of 59.5% in which male literacy is 61%, and female literacy is 46%. In Puranpur, 15% of the population is under 6 years old.

Languages spoken
 Punjabi
 Hindi
 Urdu
 English

Transportation

Bus transportation
Puranpur is well connected with Pilibhit, Delhi, Lucknow and Bareilly by State Transport UPSRTC buses. Some UPSRTC AC Shatabdi buses also run from Puranpur to Delhi, Lucknow.

Rail transportation
Puranpur railway station is on the Aishbagh-Bareilly-Kasganj railway section. The station is under the administrative control of the North Eastern Railways. Computerised reservation facility is provided.

From Delhi one has to reach first nearby Pilibhit by train.
Nowadays Railway facility is not available at Puranpur Railway Station as work is in progress for broad gauge line.

References 

Cities and towns in Pilibhit district